The meridian 24° west of Greenwich is a line of longitude that extends from the North Pole across the Arctic Ocean, Greenland, Iceland, the Atlantic Ocean, the Southern Ocean, and Antarctica to the South Pole.

The 24th meridian west forms a great circle with the 156th meridian east.

From Pole to Pole
Starting at the North Pole and heading south to the South Pole, the 24th meridian west passes through:

{| class="wikitable plainrowheaders"
! scope="col" width="125" | Co-ordinates
! scope="col" | Country, territory or sea
! scope="col" | Notes
|-
| style="background:#b0e0e6;" | 
! scope="row" style="background:#b0e0e6;" | Arctic Ocean
| style="background:#b0e0e6;" |
|-
| 
! scope="row" | 
| Herluf Trolle Land (Peary Land)
|-
| style="background:#b0e0e6;" | 
! scope="row" style="background:#b0e0e6;" | Independence Fjord and Hagen Fjord
| style="background:#b0e0e6;" |
|-
| 
! scope="row" | 
| Alabama Nunatak
|-
| style="background:#b0e0e6;" | 
! scope="row" style="background:#b0e0e6;" | Kejser Franz Joseph Fjord
| style="background:#b0e0e6;" |
|-valign="top"
| 
! scope="row" | 
| Ymer Island, Geographical Society Island and Traill Island
|-
| style="background:#b0e0e6;" | 
! scope="row" style="background:#b0e0e6;" | King Oscar Fjord
| style="background:#b0e0e6;" |
|-
| 
! scope="row" | 
| Jameson Land peninsula
|-
| style="background:#b0e0e6;" | 
! scope="row" style="background:#b0e0e6;" | Scoresby Sund
| style="background:#b0e0e6;" |
|-
| 
! scope="row" | 
|
|-
| style="background:#b0e0e6;" | 
! scope="row" style="background:#b0e0e6;" | Atlantic Ocean
| style="background:#b0e0e6;" | Greenland Sea
|-
| 
! scope="row" | 
| Westfjords peninsula
|-
| style="background:#b0e0e6;" | 
! scope="row" style="background:#b0e0e6;" | Breiðafjörður
| style="background:#b0e0e6;" |
|-
| 
! scope="row" | 
| Snæfellsnes peninsula
|-valign="top"
| style="background:#b0e0e6;" | 
! scope="row" style="background:#b0e0e6;" | Atlantic Ocean
| style="background:#b0e0e6;" | Passing just east of the island of São Nicolau,  (at ) Passing just west of the island of Santiago,  (at ) Passing just east of the island of Fogo,  (at )
|-
| style="background:#b0e0e6;" | 
! scope="row" style="background:#b0e0e6;" | Southern Ocean
| style="background:#b0e0e6;" |
|-
| 
! scope="row" | Antarctica
| British Antarctic Territory, claimed by 
|-
| style="background:#b0e0e6;" | 
! scope="row" style="background:#b0e0e6;" | Southern Ocean
| style="background:#b0e0e6;" | Weddell Sea
|-
| 
! scope="row" | Antarctica
| British Antarctic Territory, claimed by 
|-
|}

See also
23rd meridian west
25th meridian west

w024 meridian west